Kurian Mathew Vayalunkal (born 4 August 1966) is an Indian prelate of the Catholic Church who works in the diplomatic service of the Holy See as Apostolic Nuncio to Algeria. He was the Apostolic Nuncio to Papua New Guinea and the Solomon Islands from 2016 to 2021.

Biography 
Kurian Mathew Vayalunkal was born on 4 August 1966 in Vadavathoor, Kottayam, Kerala, the first of four boys born to Mr. M.C. Mathai and Mrs. Annamma Mathai.

He completed his minor seminary from St. Stanislaus Minor Seminary.  He completed his Philosophy and Theology studies at St. Joseph's pontifical Seminary, Aluva. In 1998 he obtained a doctorate in canon law from Pontifical University of the Holy Cross in Rome. He also completed his diplomatic studies at the Pontifical Ecclesiastical Academy.

He was ordained a priest on 27 December 1991. He entered the diplomatic service of the Holy See in 1998 and served in Guinea, Korea, the Dominican Republic, Bangladesh, Hungary and Egypt. He was also sent to Haiti in 2010 to oversee the Vatican's humanitarian work after an earthquake.

On 3 May 2016, Pope Francis appointed him Apostolic Nuncio to Papua New Guinea and Titular Archbishop of Ratiaria.

He received his episcopal consecration in Christ the King Cathedral of the Syro-Malabar Catholic Archeparchy of Kottayam on 25 July 2016 from Mathew Moolakkatt, Archbishop of Kottayam.
 He was appointed Apostolic Nuncio to the Solomon Islands on 21 September 2016.

Pope Francis appointed him Nuncio to Algeria on 1 January 2021.

Writings

See also
 List of heads of the diplomatic missions of the Holy See

References

Apostolic Nuncios to Papua New Guinea
Apostolic Nuncios to the Solomon Islands
Apostolic Nuncios to Algeria
Living people
Christian clergy from Kottayam
1966 births
Syro-Malabar bishops
People from Kerala